Survivor: Pearl Islands (also broadcast as Survivor: Pearl Islands — Panama) is the seventh season of the American CBS competitive reality television series Survivor. It was filmed from June 23, 2003, through July 31, 2003, and premiered on September 18, 2003. The season was filmed on the Pearl Islands, off the coast of Panama, and had a pirate culture theme. Hosted by Jeff Probst, it consisted of the usual 39 days of gameplay with 16 competitors.

Office clerk Sandra Diaz-Twine defeated scoutmaster Lillian Morris in a 6–1 jury vote.

Contestants
The sixteen players were split into two original tribes, Drake and Morgan, named after English explorer Sir Francis Drake and Welsh explorer Henry Morgan respectively. With ten contestants remaining, the two were merged into the Balboa tribe, named after an injured snake found by contestant Rupert Boneham.

Future appearances
Rupert Boneham returned for Survivor: All-Stars, Survivor: Heroes vs. Villains, and Survivor: Blood vs. Water with his wife, Laura. Boneham also appeared as a special guest on the third season of the Israeli production of Survivor, and he competed on The Amazing Race 31 with his wife Laura. Jon Dalton returned for Survivor: Micronesia. Sandra Diaz-Twine later returned on Survivor: Heroes vs. Villains, Survivor: Game Changers, and Survivor: Winners at War, as well as on Survivor: Island of the Idols to serve as a mentor alongside Rob Mariano. Andrew Savage returned for Survivor: Cambodia. Diaz-Twine competed on Australian Survivor: Blood V Water with her daughter Nina.

In 2006, Dalton competed with Survivor: Vanuatu castaway Twila Tanner on a Reality Star episode of Fear Factor. Ryan Opray competed with Survivor: South Pacific castaway Mikayla Wingle on the Amazon Prime Video series World's Toughest Race: Eco-Challenge Fiji as part of Team Peak Traverse.

Season summary
The start of the game was announced as a surprise to the contestants, most of whom believed that they were on their way to a photo shoot. After being told they would begin the game with only the clothes on their back, they were divided into two tribes of eight, Morgan and Drake, and were given some money and sent to a small village to barter and buy supplies for their camps in lieu of being given them as in seasons past. Drake, thanks to Sandra's ability to speak Spanish and Rupert stealing the other tribe's abandoned shoes to barter, was able to acquire better supplies than Morgan, and thus went on an early winning streak, dwindling Morgan to five members.

Despite Drake's winning streak, member Burton conspired to throw an immunity challenge to eliminate a weaker player. The reluctant Drake tribe threw the challenge, but Burton was voted off for his cunning. This resulted in a major shift: Morgan, led by Andrew, experienced a renewal, and Drake began to splinter due to fighting between de facto leader Rupert and the conniving Jon. Morgan's newfound momentum led them to win the next two immunity challenges, leaving both tribes with five players each. 

Upon arrival at their next challenge, the tribes were faced with the "Outcast" twist, with the six eliminated players competing against the remaining players for a chance to return to the game. The Outcasts beat both Morgan and Drake in the challenge, forcing them both to go to Tribal Council and resulting in two of the Outcasts returning to the game. Former Drake member Burton and former Morgan castaway Lillian returned to the game, and joined the eight other castaways in forming the merged Balboa tribe. While Burton made up with his former tribe, Lillian's return was resented by the Morgan members. Lillian enacted revenge against her former tribemates, siding with the Drake alliance to eliminate Andrew.

While the Drake alliance had the upper hand, Jon, Burton, and Lillian decided that Rupert, as the strongest member of the Drake alliance, was an immunity threat, and worked with the remaining Morgan members to blindside him from the game. The three navigated between the Drake and Morgan factions to take out members of both sides, until they were the dominant alliance with only five players remaining.  Lillian was swayed by Darrah and Sandra to break up the duo of Jon and Burton, and Burton was voted out for a second time. In another twist, the first five jurors were able to compete for immunity with four players remaining. They subsequently won the competition, thus leaving no one immune; challenge threat Darrah was then eliminated. 

In the final immunity challenge, Lillian beat Jon and Sandra to secure a space in the Final Tribal Council. Knowing that she would likely lose for having already been voted out of the game, she chose to take Sandra to the end for she felt Sandra deserved the victory more than Jon. The jury awarded Sandra the title of Sole Survivor over Lillian in a 6–1 vote.
 
In the case of multiple tribes or castaways who win reward or immunity, they are listed in order of finish, or alphabetically where it was a team effort; where one castaway won and invited others, the invitees are in brackets.

Episodes

Voting history

Notes

Reception

Survivor: Pearl Islands was met with critical acclaim and is generally considered to be one of the show's best seasons. It was ranked by host Jeff Probst as his 5th favorite season. Dalton Ross of Entertainment Weekly ranked it eighth, citing Rupert and Jonny Fairplay as memorable players. Both Andrea Deiher of Zap2it and Joe Reid of The Wire ranked it as the 9th-greatest season; Deiher called Dalton's lie about his grandmother "some next-level shenanigans never before seen on reality TV," and Reid described Rupert and Fairplay as "two of the series' signature players" who "pretty much made the season." Since 2012, "Survivor Oz" has consistently ranked Pearl Islands in the top 5 greatest seasons, in its annual polls ranking every season of the series; it was 4th in 2012, 3rd in 2013 and 2015, and 5th in 2014. "The Purple Rock Podcast," ranked it as the 6th best season out of 40. In the official issue of CBS Watch commemorating Survivor'''s 15th anniversary, Pearl Islands was voted by viewers as the #2 greatest season of the series, only behind Heroes vs. Villains, and thus was the highest-ranking season with an entirely new cast. Also, Sandra was ranked in another poll, in the same magazine, as the 6th greatest contestant in the series, and was the highest-ranking contestant on the list to win her first time playing. Additionally, Fairplay's infamous lie about his grandmother's death was voted as the #10 most memorable moment in the series. In 2015, a poll by Rob Has a Podcast ranked Pearl Islands 2nd out of 30, behind Heroes vs. Villains, with Rob Cesternino ranking this season 3rd. This was updated in 2021 during Cesternino's podcast, Survivor All-Time Top 40 Rankings, ranking 3rd out of 40th. In 2020, Inside Survivor'' ranked this season as the show's best out of the first 40 calling it "the quintessential Survivor season, containing everything that makes the show so great: an incredible cast, exciting gameplay, a well-worked theme, fun challenges, jawdropping moments, humor, drama, emotion, etc."

References

External links
 Official CBS Survivor Pearl Islands Website

07
2003 American television seasons
2003 in Panama
Television shows filmed in Panama